Chalice is a transgender fictional character appearing in the comic book series Alters published by Aftershock Comics and created by Paul Jenkins.

References

Comics characters introduced in 2016
LGBT superheroes
Fictional transgender women
Fictional characters with gravity abilities